Cryptorhopalum is a genus of beetles in the family Dermestidae, containing the following species:

References

Dermestidae genera